Transitions is a DJ mix compilation album by John Digweed released on Renaissance Records in 2006.

Track listing
Partial Arts - "Cruising" (6:13) 
Every - "Feelin'" (5:26)  
Popnoname - On The Run (5:52)
Margot Meets The Melody Maker - "Torch (Extrawelt Remix)" (4:45)
Tigerskin - Neontrance (5:23)
Catwash - "Plastic Rubberband" (5:18)
David K - "Beautiful Dead" (4:00) 
Diringer - "Flake Escape" (4:05)  
Rocco* - "Roots 4 Acid" (5:46) 
Trick & Kubic - "Easy (John Digweed Edit)" (3:56)
On Spec - "Knights Of Columbos (Original Mix)" (4:55)
John Digweed - "Warung Beach (Lützenkirchen Remix)" (5:17) 
Michel De Hey - "Jetchi (John Digweed Edit)" (4:02)
Dana Bergquist - "McEnroe" (4:17)  
Paul Kalkbrenner - "Gebrünn Gebrünn" (5:38)

References

External links

John Digweed albums
2006 compilation albums